Formula One Air Racing is an American motorsport that involves small aircraft using engines up to  in displacement. Racers can reach speeds over 200 mph.

History 
Formula One air racing is sanctioned by the International Aeronautics Federation.
Formula One was first proposed in 1936 as "midget racing". The 190 Cubic in specification was set in 1946, and the first competition was set in 1947. Some 1930s air racers, like the Chester Jeep and Loose Special were retrofitted with smaller engines to compete. With the introduction of the Continental O-200 engine, the maximum engine displacement was raised to 200 cubic inches in 1968. The aircraft must also have fixed landing gear, and a fixed pitch propeller. Racers compete in a  Oval course.

Several aircraft were capable of meeting the specifications for Formula One at its creation. Specific designs were introduced shortly after that maximized speed for the configuration.

Aircraft

References

External links
International Formula One Air Racing website
Technical Design Rules for IF1 aircraft

Air racing